James Moir MacKenzie (17 October 1886 – 22 January 1963) was a Scotland international rugby union player. He was the 62nd President of the Scottish Rugby Union.

Rugby Union career

Amateur career

He played for Edinburgh University.

Provincial career

He played for Edinburgh District in the inter-city match of 1906.

He played for the Blues Trial side against the Whites Trial side on 21 January 1911 while still with Edinburgh University.

International career

He was capped nine times for Scotland between 1905 and 1911.

Administrative career

He was President of the Scottish Rugby Union for the period 1948 to 1949.

References

1886 births
1963 deaths
Scottish rugby union players
Scotland international rugby union players
Anglo-Scots
Edinburgh University RFC players
Edinburgh District (rugby union) players
Presidents of the Scottish Rugby Union
Blues Trial players
Rugby union players from Sunderland
Rugby union forwards